= Aba-wa =

- Location in Burma
- Coordinates: 17°39′N 96°44′E
- Country: Burma
- Division: Bago Division

Population (2005)
  - Religions: Buddhism
- Time zone: UTC+6.30 (MST)

Aba-wa is a village in the Bago Division of south-east Myanmar. It is located approximately 45 kilometres (28 mi) north-east of Bago.
